Finotti is a surname of Italian origin. Notable people with the surname include:

Joseph M. Finotti (1817-1879), Italian Jesuit, writer, and editor
Rick Finotti (born 1981), American football coach

Surnames of Italian origin